Homo erectus is a species of archaic humans.

Homo erectus may also refer to:

 Homo erectus subspecies, numerous subspecies divisions of H. erectus, especially Asian erectus subspecies

Arts and entertainment
 Homo Erectus (film), 2007 comedy film
 Homo erectus (album), 1998 rock/pop album
 Homo Erectus, a Japanese metal album by Orange Sunshine published by Leaf Hound Records

See also
 Homo
 H. erectus (disambiguation)
 Homo (disambiguation)
 Erectus (disambiguation)